Oriomo may refer to:

Geography
Oriomo Plateau of Papua New Guinea
Oriomo River, a river in Western Province of Papua New Guinea
Oriomo-Bituri Rural LLG, Papua New Guinea

Languages
Oriomo languages
Bine language, a Papuan language of New Guinea
Wipi language, a Papuan language of New Guinea